Sooranporu or Soorasamharam part of Kandha Sashti Vratham festival is a ritual folk performance that recreates the killing of Asuras by Lord Murugan. It is performed mainly in  Tamil Nadu. It is also celebrated in Andhra Pradesh, Sri Lanka and the district of Palakkad in Kerala at temples dedicated to Murugan. Since the Tamil calendar months are based on the  solar portion of the Hindu calendar, this festival falls in the month of either Aippasi or Karthigai in the Tamil calendar.

The Sooranporu performance is based on the story of Murugan, also known as Kandha, as given in the Kandhapurana. In the days preceding the performance the Kandhapaurana is narrated in the temple. The performance ends with the killing of Sooran (or Padmasura) and his race which is depicted through the symbolic beheading of the four Asuras Anamughan, Panumughan, Simhamughan and Soorapadman. The Asuras are beheaded by Murugan using his weapon the vel a kind of spear or javelin. For the performance the vel is specially consecrated and during the staging of the show it is ceremonially placed on the neck of the effigy after which the head is removed, depicting the beheading of the Asura. Sooranporu is staged at the end of a week-long Kanda Sashti festival.

Sooranporu is preceded by several ceremonies on the last day of the Kanda Sashti festival. Special pujas are conducted and the deity of Murugan is ritually anointed (abhishekam) and devotees seek the deity's darshan. In some parts of Tamil Nadu devotees observe a six-day fast which they break at the end of the Sooranporu. In Palani, a procession of Lord Murugan (known here as Dandayuthapaniswamy) is taken down from the hill temple and led through the main thoroughfares of the town before the Sooranporu.

At Thiruchendur Murugan Temple, six days celebrations for Kanda Sashti start from Pirathamai of Aippasi Masam culminate on Soorasamharam day. Thiru Kalyanam is observed on the next day of Soorasamharam.

Every year temple idol procession is taken out in cities during the festival of Soora Samhaaram. In Tamil Nadu, Sooranporu is witnessed every year by large crowds of devotees and the state government and Indian Railways ply special buses and trains to facilitate their travel. In Kerala's Palakkad district, Sooranporu is held in all the major Tamil settlements in the district.

References

External links 
http://www.tiruchendurmurugantemple.tnhrce.in/festival.html

Asura
Religious vernacular drama
Tamil culture
Theatre in India
Hindu traditions
October observances
November observances
Kaumaram

Festivals in Tamil Nadu